Foerste is a surname. Notable people with the surname include:

 August Foerste (1862–1936), American geologist, science teacher, and paleontologist
 Maxime Foerste (born 1991), German actress

See also
 Renata Forste, American sociologist